The 1977 Shia protests in Iraq, or the Safar uprising, were a series of demonstrations and riots against the Iraqi government in Karbala and Najaf Governorates, the demonstrations started on 4 February 1977 and finished on 9 February in the same year. Demonstrators had taken to the streets to demonstrate against the  Iraqi government because they had blocked Arbaʽeen Pilgrimage. The Iraqi security forces killed and arrested many protesters and presented them to trial in a revolution court, the revolution court declared execution for eight demonstrators and life imprisonment for 16 demonstrators.

Background 
On 17 July 1968 the Ba'athism took power in Iraq, Ba'athism  is an Arab nationalist and Arab socialist ideology that promotes the development and creation of a unified Arab state. In 1977, Ba'athism  attempted to ban an annual pilgrimage to Karbala as well as attempted to ban  religious processions. This move sparked protests, with the pilgrimage transforming into the 1977 Safar uprising in holy shia citys.

Timeline 
4 February: In Najaf city, many protesters went out in the street and were blocked from going to Karbala for Arbaʽeen Pilgrimagee. The protesters stayed in Khan Al-Musala (Al-Rube) for the night
5 February: The protesters arrived Al-Haydreyah (Khan Al-Nus), a small town located north of Najaf. The protesters stayed there that night
6 February: In Al-Haydreyah town, one protestor was killed. His name was Muhammed Al-Mayali. He was killed after violent clashes between protesters and Iraqi security forces. The protesters set many police offices on fire along the road between Najaf and Karbala. The protesters arrived to Khan Khan al-Rubu' (Khan al-Nukhaylah) and remained there in the night.
(7 ,8 and 9) February: The Iraqi government sent the Republican Guard forces and some Iraqi army units to Karbala and Najaf to end the demonstrations and riots. They were successful in stopping the protests in Karbala and Najaf governorates

The names of the executed demonstrators through revolution court
 Jassim Sadiq Al-Irwani
 Youssef Sattar Al-Asadi
 Muhammed Said Al-Balagy
 Najeh Muhammed Karim
 Sahib Rahim Abu Kalal
 Abbas Hadi Ajenah
 Kamil Naji Malo
 Gazi Judi Khuwayr

See also 

 The Five Martyrs
 1979–1980 Shia uprising in Iraq

References

1977 in Iraq
Shia Islam in Iraq
Karbala Governorate
Najaf Governorate